The 2007 ABC Supply Company/A.J. Foyt 225 was a race in the 2007 IRL IndyCar Series, held at The Milwaukee Mile. It was held over the weekend of 1 -June 3, 2007, as the sixth round of the seventeen-race calendar.

Classification

References
IndyCar Series

ABC Supply Company A.J. Foyt 225
Milwaukee Indy 225
ABC Supply
ABC Supply Company A.J. Foyt 225